Fudbalski Klub BPI Slavija is a Serbian football club based in Slavija, Belgrade.

Name history
FK BPI Pekar (1930–2006) nekadašnji MPI Beograd (Mlinsko pekarska industrija Beograd)
FK BPI Slavija (2007–)

History

Recent seasons
{|class="wikitable"
|-bgcolor="#efefef"
! Season
! League
! Pos.
! Pl.
! W
! D
! L
! GS
! GA
! P
!Cup
!Notes
!    Manager
|-
|2002–03
|bgcolor=grey|4 – Belgrade
|align=right bgcolor=#cc9966|3
|align=right|34||align=right|20||align=right|8||align=right|6
|align=right|67||align=right|33||align=right|68
|did not qualify
|
|
|-
|2003–04
|bgcolor=grey|4 – Belgrade
|align=right bgcolor=silver|2
|align=right|34||align=right|23||align=right|6||align=right|5
|align=right|78||align=right|32||align=right|75
|did not qualify
|Promoted
|
|-
|2004–05
|bgcolor=#98bb98|3 – Belgrade
|align=right |13
|align=right|34||align=right|10||align=right|10||align=right|14
|align=right|44||align=right|65||align=right|40
|did not qualify
|
|
|-
|2005–06
|bgcolor=#98bb98|3 – Belgrade
|align=right |14
|align=right|38||align=right|12||align=right|10||align=right|16
|align=right|47||align=right|48||align=right|46
|did not qualify
|
|
|-
|2006–07
|bgcolor=#98bb98|3 – Belgrade
|align=right |17
|align=right|34||align=right|4||align=right|9||align=right|21
|align=right|20||align=right|60||align=right|20
|did not qualify
|Relegated (1 point deducted)
|
|-
|}

External links
 Club profile at Srbijafudbal

Football clubs in Belgrade
Association football clubs established in 1912
1912 establishments in Serbia